Cecil George Cumberland (22 February 1875 – 14 July 1951), the brother of Vic Cumberland, was an Australian rules footballer who played five senior games with Melbourne in the Victorian Football League (VFL) in 1899.

Notes

External links 

1875 births
Australian rules footballers from Tasmania
Melbourne Football Club players
1951 deaths
People from Toorak, Victoria
Australian rules footballers from Melbourne